A zibellino,  flea-fur or fur tippet is a women's fashion accessory popular in the later 15th and 16th centuries. A zibellino, from the Italian word for "sable", is the pelt of a sable or marten worn draped at the neck or hanging at the waist, or carried in the hand.  The plural is zibellini. Some zibellini were fitted with faces and paws of goldsmith's work with jeweled eyes and pearl earrings, while unadorned furs were also fashionable.

History

The earliest surviving mention of a marten pelt to be worn as neck ornament occurs in an inventory of Charles the Bold, Duke of Burgundy, dated 1467, but the fashion was widespread in Northern Italy by the 1490s. Eleonora de Toledo owned at least four; the weasel was an early modern talisman for fertility and Leonora was applauded as La Fecondissima, "most fertile" for the number of her children. Eleonora's daughter Isabella de' Medici appears with a zibellino in a portrait by a member of Bronzino's studio painted at the time of her marriage in 1558 to Paolo Giordano Orsini.

The style spread to the north and west. The traditional costume historian's term for this accessory, flea-fur, is from the German Flohpelz, coined by Wendelin Boeheim in 1894, who was the first to suggest that the furs were intended to attract fleas away from the body of the wearer.  There is no historical evidence to support this claim.  Italians simply called these accessories "zibellini", their word for sables and speakers of other languages called them "martens", "sables" or "ermines" in their native tongues.

The fashion for carrying zibellini died out in the first years of the 17th century, although fox, mink and other pelts were worn in similar fashion in the 19th and 20th century.

England and Scotland
The jewelled gold heads and feet of zibellini were detailed in several royal inventories. The Edinburgh goldsmith John Mosman made a marten's head and feet from Scottish gold for Mary of Guise in December 1539. Her daughter, Mary, Queen of Scots, brought fur pieces on her return to Scotland from France in 1561; one of her zibellini had a head of jet.

In England, when Lady Jane Grey was at the Tower of London in 1553, she had a "sable skin, with a head of gold, muffled, garnished and set with four emeralds, four turquoises, six rubies, two diamonds and five pearls; four feet of gold, each set with a turquoise, the tongue being a ruby". Another sable skin used by Jane Grey had a clock or watch attached. Both sable skins had belonged to the wives of Henry VIII. Elizabeth I of England received a "Sable Skynne the hed and fourre featte of gold fully furnished with Dyamondes and Rubyes" as a New Year's Gift from the Earl of Leicester in 1585.

Frances Sidney, Countess of Sussex hold a jewelled gold marten's head and fur in her 1570s portrait at Sidney Sussex College, Cambridge. In 1578 Margaret Douglas, Countess of Lennox bequeathed a sable with a gold head set with diamonds to Arbella Stuart. In 1606 Anne of Denmark owned "a sable head of gold with a collar or muzzle attached, garnished with diamonds, rubies, emeralds, and sapphires, with four feet", possibly inherited from Elizabeth or Mary, Queen of Scots.

Gallery

See also
Tippet

Notes

References
Arnold, Janet, Queen Elizabeth's Wardrobe Unlock'd, W S Maney and Son Ltd, Leeds 1988. 
Hawes, Elizabeth, Fashion is Spinach, New York, Random House, 1938 
Netherton, Robin, and Gale R. Owen-Crocker, editors, Medieval Clothing and Textiles, Volume 2, Woodbridge, Suffolk, UK, and Rochester, NY, the Boydell Press, 2006, 
 Payne, Blanche, History of Costume from the Ancient Egyptians to the Twentieth Century, Harper & Row, 1965. No ISBN for this edition; ASIN B0006BMNFS
Scarisbrick, Diana, Tudor and Jacobean Jewellery, London, Tate Publishing, 1995,

External links

 Zibellini (aka "Flea Furs") in 16th Century Portraits
 Gold and jewelled marten's head from the Walters Art Museum, Baltimore
The Muff in Sixteenth Century Dress, From Fleas to Fancy

History of clothing (Western fashion)
Fashion accessories
Fur